John Wingfield (1560–1626) was an English politician who sat in the House of Commons at various times between 1597 and 1626.

Wingfield was the son of Robert Wingfield of Upton, Northamptonshire and his wife Elizabeth Cecil, daughter of Richard Cecil of Little Burghley, Northamptonshire. He was educated at Westminster School and entered Trinity College, Cambridge in 1578. He was Justice of the Peace for Kesteven, Lincolnshire from about 1583. He was feodary of  Lincolnshire from 1594 to 1600 and was able to purchase lands in Rutland. In 1597, he was elected Member of Parliament for Peterborough.
 
John Wingfield's elder brother Robert, of Upton (1558–1609), was MP for Stamford between 1584 and 1604. John Wingfield died at the age of about 66 and was buried in St Peter's Church, Tickencote.

Wingfield married first Elizabeth Gresham daughter of Paul Gresham, who brought him the manor of Tickencote in Rutland which became his principal residence. They had at least three sons and a daughter. She died in 1602 and he married secondly Margaret Blyth, widow of John Blyth of Denton and daughter of Robert Thorold of Haugh, Lincolnshire. They had two sons and three daughters.

References

 

1560 births
1626 deaths
English MPs 1597–1598
English MPs 1621–1622
English MPs 1626
People from Upton, Northamptonshire
People from Rutland